Nora Subschinski (born 5 June 1988 in East Berlin, East Germany) is a German diver. She participates in the 3m springboard and 10m platform competitions.

She won the bronze medal at the 2007 and 2011 world championships. She won four gold and four silver medals at the LEN European Aquatics Championships, together with her 24 German championships.

At the 2004 and 2008 Summer Olympics, she competed in the women's synchronised 10 m platform with Annett Gamm.  In 2004, the team finished in 6th, while in 2008 they finished in 4th.

At the 2012 Summer Olympics, she competed in the women's 3 m springboard and the women's synchronised 10 m platform with Christin Steuer.  She finished in 14th in the individual event, and the team finished in 6th in synchronised event.

At the 2016 Summer Olympics, she finished in 9th place in the women's 3m springboard competition. She also competed in the women's synchronized 3m springboard event with teammate Tina Punzel. They finished in 7th place.

References

German female divers
Living people
1988 births
Divers at the 2004 Summer Olympics
Divers at the 2008 Summer Olympics
Divers at the 2012 Summer Olympics
Divers at the 2016 Summer Olympics
Olympic divers of Germany
World Aquatics Championships medalists in diving